Changzhou Avenue Subdistrict is a subdistrict situated in the northern portion of Hedong District, Tianjin. it shares border with Yueyahe and Huaming Subdistricts to the north, Lushan Avenue Subdistrict to the east, Xiangyanglou Subdistrict to the south, and Chunhua Subdistrict to the west. According to the 2010 Chinese Census, the subdistrict had 51,447 inhabitants under its administration.

The subdistrict was created in 1981. Its name corresponds to Changzhou Avenue that runs through it.

Administrative divisions 
As of 2021, Changzhou Avenue Subdistrict covered these 13 communities:

References 

Township-level divisions of Tianjin
Hedong District, Tianjin